

Fossils

 Joshua Platt, a dealer in curiosities, discovers three large dinosaurian vertebrae at Stonesfield. He sends them off for examination to a Quaker botanist, merchant, and friend of Benjamin Franklin named Peter Collinson. Sadly, Collinson never gives them Platt's desired examination, and the fate and specific identity of the fossils remain unknown.

References

18th century in paleontology
Paleontology
Paleontology 5
Paleontology